This is a list of reptile species and subspecies found in North Carolina, based mainly on checklists from the North Carolina Museum of Natural Sciences. Common and scientific names are according to the Society for the Study of Amphibians and Reptiles publications.

(I) - Introduced
(V) - Venomous snake

Alligator
Order: Crocodilia
Family: Alligatoridae
American alligator Alligator mississippiensis

Turtles
Order: Testudines

Suborder: Cryptodira
Family: Chelydridae
Snapping turtle Chelydra serpentina
Family: Kinosternidae
Striped mud turtle Kinosternon baurii
Southeastern mud turtle Kinosternon subrubrum subrubrum
Stripe-necked musk turtle Sternotherus minor peltifer
Eastern musk turtle Sternotherus odoratus
Family: Emydidae
Eastern painted turtle Chrysemys picta picta
Spotted turtle Clemmys guttata
Eastern chicken turtle Deirochelys reticularia reticularia
Bog turtle Glyptemys muhlenbergii
Northern map turtle Graptemys geographica
Diamond-backed terrapin Malaclemys terrapin
Eastern river cooter Pseudemys concinna concinna
Coastal plain cooter Pseudemys concinna floridana
Northern red-bellied cooter Pseudemys rubriventris
Woodland box turtle Terrapene carolina carolina
Red-eared slider Trachemys scripta elegans (I)
Yellow-bellied slider Trachemys scripta scripta
Cumberland slider Trachemys scripta troostii
Family: Dermochelyidae
Leatherback sea turtle Dermochelys coriacea
Family: Cheloniidae
Loggerhead sea turtle Caretta caretta
Green sea turtle Chelonia mydas
Atlantic hawksbill sea turtle Eretmochelys imbricata imbricata
Kemp's ridley sea turtle Lepidochelys kempii
Family: Trionychidae
Gulf Coast spiny softshell Apalone spinifera aspera
Eastern spiny softshell Apalone spinifera spinifera

Lizards
Order: Squamata

Suborder: Gekkota
Family: Gekkonidae
Mediterranean gecko Hemidactylus turcicus (I)

Suborder: Iguania
Family: Iguanidae
Green anole Anolis carolinensis
Texas horned lizard Phrynosoma cornutum (I)
Eastern fence lizard Sceloporus undulatus

Suborder: Autarchoglossa
Family: Teiidae
Eastern six-lined racerunner Aspidoscelis sexlineata sexlineata
Family: Scincidae
Coal skink Plestiodon anthracinus
Common five-lined skink Plestiodon fasciatus
Southeastern five-lined skink Plestiodon inexpectatus
Broad-headed skink Plestiodon laticeps
Little brown skink Scincella lateralis
Family: Anguidae
Eastern slender glass lizard Ophisaurus attenuatus longicaudus
Mimic glass lizard Ophisaurus mimicus
Eastern glass lizard Ophisaurus ventralis

Snakes
Order: Squamata

Suborder: Serpentes
Family: Colubridae
Eastern wormsnake Carphophis amoenus amoenus
Northern scarletsnake Cemophora coccinea copei
Northern black racer Coluber constrictor constrictor
Eastern coachwhip Coluber flagellum flagellum
Northern ring-necked snake Diadophis punctatus edwardsii
Southern ring-necked snake Diadophis punctatus punctatus
Eastern mudsnake Farancia abacura abacura
Common rainbow snake Farancia erytrogramma erytrogramma
Rough earthsnake Haldea striatula
Eastern hog-nosed snake Heterodon platirhinos
Southern hog-nosed snake Heterodon simus
Scarlet kingsnake Lampropeltis elapsoides
Eastern kingsnake Lampropeltis getula
Northern mole kingsnake Lampropeltis rhombomaculata
Eastern milksnake Lampropeltis triangulum
Carolina swampsnake Liodytes pygaea paludis
Eastern glossy swampsnake Liodytes rigida rigida
Plain-bellied watersnake Nerodia erythrogaster
Banded watersnake Nerodia fasciata fasciata
Northern watersnake Nerodia sipedon sipedon
Carolina watersnake Nerodia sipedon williamengelsi
Brown watersnake Nerodia taxispilota
Northern rough greensnake Opheodrys aestivus aestivus
Smooth greensnake Opheodrys vernalis
Eastern ratsnake Pantherophis alleghaniensis
Red cornsnake Pantherophis guttatus
Gray ratsnake Pantherophis spiloides
Northern pinesnake Pituophis melanoleucus melanoleucus
Queensnake Regina septemvittata
Pine woods littersnake Rhadinaea flavilata
Dekay's brownsnake Storeria dekayi
Red-bellied snake Storeria occipitomaculata
Southeastern crowned snake Tantilla coronata
Common ribbonsnake Thamnophis sauritus sauritus
Eastern gartersnake Thamnophis sirtalis sirtalis
Eastern smooth earthsnake Virginia valeriae valeriae
Family: Elapidae
Harlequin coralsnake Micrurus fulvius (V)
Family: Viperidae
Eastern copperhead Agkistrodon contortrix (V)
Northern cottonmouth Agkistrodon piscivorus (V)
Eastern diamond-backed rattlesnake Crotalus adamanteus (V)
Timber rattlesnake Crotalus horridus (V)
Carolina pygmy rattlesnake Sistrurus miliarius miliarius (V)

References

Further reading

External links

SSAR North American Species Names Database
Integrated Taxonomic Information System

North Carolina
Reptiles